This is a list of horror films that were released in 2019.

References

External links
 Horror films of 2019 on Internet Movie Database

 
2019
2019-related lists